Indian commodity exchange may refer to

 Indian Commodity Exchange
 Multi Commodity Exchange of India
 National Commodity and Derivatives Exchange
 Meerut Agro Commodities Exchange

See also
 Indian stock exchange (disambiguation)